Zhang Qinqiu (November 15, 1904 – April 22, 1968) was a Chinese Communist revolutionary, military commander, and politician. She was one of the first female members of the Communist Party of China, and one of the 28 Bolsheviks trained in Moscow. A high-ranking commander of the Fourth Front Army of the Chinese Red Army during the Long March, she is often considered the only woman general of the Red Army. After the founding of the People's Republic of China, she served as Deputy Minister of Textile Industry. She was persecuted during the Cultural Revolution and committed suicide in 1968.

Early life and education

On 15 November 1904, Zhang Qinqiu was born to an affluent family in Shimen, Tongxiang, Zhejiang Province. She entered Hangzhou Girls Normal School (now Hangzhou No. 14 High School) in 1920, before going to Shanghai for further education. In Shanghai she met the famous novelist Mao Dun (Shen Yanbing), who was married to Zhang's elementary school classmate Kong Dezhi, and his younger brother Shen Zemin, one of the earliest members of the Communist Party of China (CPC).

In 1924, Zhang entered the sociology department of the left-wing Shanghai University, where Shen Zemin was an instructor and the early Communist leader Qu Qiubai was the department head. Zhang joined the CPC in November 1924, becoming one of the first female CPC members. She married Shen Zemin a year later. Under the leadership of Xiang Jingyu, Zhang and other women students established a night school for women workers in Shanghai, and organized a strike of silk workers in 1924. She also recruited some of the workers into the CPC.

In November 1925, the CPC sent more than 100 party members, including Zhang Qinqiu, to study at Moscow Sun Yat-sen University in the Soviet Union. Shen Zemin joined her soon afterwards. In May 1926, she gave birth to a daughter named Zhang Maya (张玛娅). In Moscow, Zhang and Shen became members of the 28 Bolsheviks, which included future CPC leaders Wang Ming, Bo Gu, Zhang Wentian, and Yang Shangkun. She became proficient in Russian after two years of study, and worked as an interpreter for the CPC. She also worked in textile mills to learn production and management methods.

Military career
In 1930, Zhang and Shen returned to China, leaving their daughter in Moscow. In January 1931, when Wang Ming became the leader of the CPC, Shen Zemin was elected to the 6th CPC Central Committee and appointed propaganda chief of the CPC. In 1931, Shen and Zhang went to the Communist base in the border region of Hubei, Henan and Anhui (E-Yu-Wan) Provinces, which was under the leadership of Zhang Guotao.

After being attacked by the 200,000-strong Kuomintang forces in the Encirclement Campaigns, the E-Yu-Wan Red Army decided to abandon the base and break out of the encirclement to Sichuan-Shaanxi region in the west. Shen Zemin, who suffered from lung disease, insisted on remaining at the base. He died in November 1933. In November 1932, Zhang Qinqiu was appointed Director of the General Political Department of the Fourth Front Army, the highest war-time position ever held by a woman in the Chinese Communist army. She is often called the only woman general of the Red Army.

In March 1934, Zhang was appointed Commander and Political Commissar of the Women's Independent Regiment of the Fourth Front Army, commanding 2,000 women soldiers. In 1935, she joined the Long March under the command of Zhang Guotao. In 1936, she married Chen Changhao, political commissar of the Fourth Front Army and another member of the 28 Bolsheviks. In October, 20,000 soldiers of the Fourth Front Army were split into the Western Route Army (西路军) and arrived in the Hexi Corridor of Gansu Province. The Western Route Army was surrounded and defeated by the forces of the Hui Ma clique then in control of Gansu. Zhang, who had just given birth to a baby who had to be abandoned, was captured and sent to the capital Nanjing.

After the Xi'an Incident in December 1936, the Kuomintang government and the Communist rebels suspended their civil war and formed the Second United Front to resist the Japanese invasion. Zhang was released and sent to Yan'an, the de facto capital of the Communists. As more people arrived in Yan'an from areas occupied by Japan, the Chinese Women's University was established and Zhang became its dean. Her husband Chen Changhao had in 1938 gone to the Soviet Union for medical treatment, where he later lived with a Russian woman. Zhang divorced Chen in 1943, and married her third husband Su Jingguan (苏井观), an army doctor. She was a member of the Women's Committee of the Central Committee of the CPC in the 1940s, and attended the Second International Federation of Democratic Women of 1948 in Budapest.

People's Republic of China
After the founding of the People's Republic of China in 1949, Zhang was appointed Vice Minister of Textile Industry, partly because of her earlier experience of organizing textile workers in Shanghai in the 1920s. Her husband Su Jingguan (died 1964) was appointed Vice Minister of Public Health. As a civilian, she did not receive a military rank when the People's Liberation Army first awarded them in 1955, even though many of her former subordinates, including Chen Geng, Xu Shiyou, Hong Xuezhi, and Liu Huaqing, were awarded the rank of general or grand general.

When the Cultural Revolution began in 1966, Zhang and her family members were severely persecuted. In April 1968, she committed suicide by jumping from the balcony of her office. Her ex-husband Chen Changhao also killed himself. In 1976, her daughter Zhang Maya committed suicide by drug overdose.

After the end of the Cultural Revolution in 1976, Zhang was posthumously rehabilitated. In June 1979, Marshal Xu Xiangqian, her former comrade in the Fourth Front Army, held a memorial ceremony for her, which was attended by Li Xiannian, Wang Zhen, Yu Qiuli, Chen Xilian and Hu Yaobang.

References

Bibliography

1904 births
1968 deaths
Politicians from Jiaxing
Moscow Sun Yat-sen University alumni
People of the Chinese Civil War
Chinese military leaders
Chinese prisoners of war
Suicides during the Cultural Revolution
Suicides by jumping in China
Women in war in China
Chinese women in politics
Female army generals
Women in warfare post-1945
Chinese politicians who committed suicide
People from Tongxiang
Generals from Zhejiang